Stevie O'Reilly (born 13 December 1966) is a Scottish former football referee who was active in the Scottish Premier League. He also refereed at youth internationals and has been the fourth official in the UEFA Champions League and UEFA Cup in season 2007–08.

References

External links
Stevie O'Reilly, Soccerbase

1966 births
Living people
Scottish football referees
Scottish Football League referees
Scottish Premier League referees
Scottish Professional Football League referees